Eastern sigillata D (ESD, also known by the regional designation Cypriot sigillata) is a Roman-period tableware, or terra sigillata, produced in Cyprus. The term 'ESD' was coined by R. Rosenthal in 1978 as an extension of the nomenclature established by Kathleen Kenyon at Samaria.

See also
 Eastern sigillata A (ESA)
 Eastern sigillata B (ESB)
 Eastern sigillata C (ESC)

Further reading
 Hayes, John. 1985. ''Sigillate Orientali;; in Enciclopedia dell'arte antica classica e orientale. Atlante delle Forme Ceramiche II, Ceramica Fine Romana nel Bacino Mediterraneo (Tardo Ellenismo e Primo Impero), Rome: 1-96.

References

Ancient Roman pottery